The 2015 Girls Youth Volleyball World Championship was held in Lima, Peru from 7 August to 16 August 2015.

Qualification
The FIVB Sports Events Council confirmed a proposal to streamline the number of teams participating in the Age Group World Championships on 14 December 2013.

Pool composition

The drawing of lots was held in Lima, Peru on 11 June 2015. Numbers in brackets denote the World ranking as of 23 April 2015 except the host who ranked 4th.

Squads

Venues

Pool standing procedure
 Number of matches won
 Match points
 Sets ratio
 Points ratio
 Result of the last match between the tied teams

Match won 3–0 or 3–1: 3 match points for the winner, 0 match points for the loser
Match won 3–2: 2 match points for the winner, 1 match point for the loser

Preliminary round
All times are Peru Time (UTC−05:00).

Pool A

|}

|}

Pool B

|}

|}

Pool C

|}

|}

Pool D

|}

|}

Final round
All times are Peru Time (UTC−05:00).

17th–20th places

|}

|}

1st–16th places

Round of 16

|}

9th–16th quarterfinals

|}

Quarterfinals

|}

13th–16th semifinals

|}

9th–12th semifinals

|}

5th–8th semifinals

|}

Semifinals

|}

15th place match

|}

13th place match

|}

11th place match

|}

9th place match

|}

7th place match

|}

5th place match

|}

3rd place match

|}

Final

|}

Final standing

Awards

Most Valuable Player
  Paola Egonu
Best Setter
  Alessia Orro
Best Outside Spikers
  Paola Egonu
  Li Yingying

Best Middle Blockers
  Jovana Kocić
  Zehra Güneş
Best Opposite Spiker
  Kathryn Plummer
Best Libero
  Zang Qianqian

See also
2015 FIVB Volleyball Boys' U19 World Championship

References

External links

FIVB Girls Youth World Championship
FIVB Volleyball Girls' U18 World Championship
Sports competitions in Lima
International volleyball competitions hosted by Peru
Voll